The following is a table of drugs organized by their year of discovery.

Naturally occurring chemicals in plants, including alkaloids, have been used since pre-history. In the modern era, plant-based drugs have been isolated, purified and synthesised anew. Synthesis of drugs has led to novel drugs, including those that have not existed before in nature, particularly drugs based on known drugs which have been modified by chemical or biological processes.

Antiquity

Prehistory 

Archaeological evidence indicates that the use of medicinal plants dates back to the Paleolithic age.

4th millennium BCE 
In ancient Egypt, herbs are mentioned in Egyptian medical papyri, depicted in tomb illustrations, or on rare occasions found in medical jars containing trace amounts of herbs. Medical recipes from 4000 BCE were for liquid preparations rather than solids. In 4th millennium BCE, Soma (drink) and Haoma are named, but is not clear what ingredients were used to prepare them.

3rd millennium BCE

2nd millennium BCE 

Written around 1600 BCE, the Edwin Smith Papyrus describes the use of many herbal drugs. The Ebers Papyrus – one of the most important medical papyri of ancient Egypt – was written around 1550 BCE, and covers more than 700 drugs, mainly of plant origin. The first references to pills were found on papyri in ancient Egypt, and contained bread dough, honey, or grease. Medicinal ingredients such as plant powders or spices were mixed in and formed by hand to make little balls, or pills. The papyri also describe how to prepare herbal teas, poultices, ointments, eye drops, suppositories, enemas, laxatives, etc. Aloe vera was used in the 2nd millennium BCE.

1st millennium BCE 

In Greece, Theophrastus of Eresos wrote Historia Plantarum in the 4th century BCE. Seeds likely used for herbalism have been found in archaeological sites of Bronze Age China dating from the Shang dynasty (c. 1600 BCE–c. 1046 BCE). Over a hundred of the 224 drugs mentioned in the Huangdi Neijing – an early Chinese medical text – are herbs. Herbs also commonly featured in the medicine of ancient India, where the principal treatment for diseases was diet.

Opioids are among the world's oldest known drugs. Use of the opium poppy for medical, recreational, and religious purposes can be traced to the 4th century BCE, when Hippocrates wrote about it for its analgesic properties, stating, "Divinum opus est sedare dolores." ("Divine work is the easing of pain")

1st century CE 

Pliny the Elder, who lived from 23–79 CE, first gave a name to what we now call pills, calling them . Pliny also wrote Naturalis Historia a collection of 38 books and the first pharmacopoea.

Pedanius Dioscorides wrote De Materia Medica (c. 40 – 90 CE); this book dominated the area of drug knowledge for some 1500 years until the 1600s.

Jojoba was used in the 1st millennium CE.

2nd century CE

Aelius Galenus wrote more than 11 books about drugs, also use terra sigillata with kaolinite and goats blood to produce tablets.

Post-classical to Early modern 
Drugs developed in the post-classical (circa 500 to 1450) or early modern eras (circa 1453 to 1789).

6th–11th century CE

In 754, during Abbasid Caliphate were formed the first pharmacies in Baghdad.

In middle age ointments were a common dosage form.

11th century CE

Avicenna separates Medicine and Pharmacy, in 1025 published his book The Canon of Medicine, an encyclopedia of medicine formed by five books. Drugs mentioned by Avicenna include agaric, scammony and euphorbium. The latex of Euphorbia resinifera contains Resiniferatoxin, an ultra potent capsaicin analog.  Desensitization to resiniferatoxin is tested in clinical trials to treat neuropathic pain.

16th century CE

Paracelsus expounded the concept of dose response in his Third Defense, where he stated that "Solely the dose determines that a thing is not a poison." This was used to defend his use of inorganic substances in medicine as outsiders frequently criticized Paracelsus' chemical agents as too toxic to be used as therapeutic agents. Paracelsus discovered that the alkaloids in opium are far more soluble in alcohol than water. Having experimented with various opium concoctions, Paracelsus came across a specific tincture of opium that was of considerable use in reducing pain. He called this preparation laudanum.

For over a thousand years South American indigenous peoples have chewed Erythroxylon coca leaves, which contain alkaloids such as cocaine. Coca leaf remains have been found with ancient Peruvian mummies. There is also evidence coca leaves were used as an anesthetic. In 1569, Spanish botanist Nicolás Monardes described the indigenous peoples' practice of chewing a mixture of tobacco and coca leaves to induce "great contentment".

1400s Nicotine (Tobacco)

18th century CE

In 1778 John Mudge created the first inhaler devices. In 1747, James Lind, surgeon of HMS Salisbury, conducted the first clinical trial ever recorded, on it he studied how citrus fruit were capable of curing scurvy.

Modern

19th century CE

In the 1830s chemist Justus von Liebig began the synthesis of organic molecules, stating that "The production of all organic substances no longer belongs just to living organisms."  In 1832 produced chloral hydrate, the first synthetic sleeping drug. In 1833 French chemist Anselme Payen was the first to discover an enzyme, diastase. In 1834, François Mothes and Joseph Dublanc created a method to produce a single-piece gelatin capsule that was sealed with a drop of gelatin solution. In 1853 Alexander Wood was the first physician that used hypodermic needle to dispense drugs via Injections. In 1858 Dr. M. Sales Giron invented the first pressurized inhaler.

Amphetamine was first synthesized in 1887 in Germany by Romanian chemist Lazăr Edeleanu who named it phenylisopropylamine; its stimulant effects remained unknown until 1927, when it was independently resynthesized by Gordon Alles and reported to have sympathomimetic properties. Shortly after amphetamine, methamphetamine was synthesized from ephedrine in 1893 by Japanese chemist Nagai Nagayoshi. Three decades later, in 1919, methamphetamine hydrochloride was synthesized by pharmacologist Akira Ogata via reduction of ephedrine using red phosphorus and iodine.

20th century CE

In 1901 Jōkichi Takamine isolated and synthesized the first hormone, Adrenaline. In 1907 Alfred Bertheim synthesized Arsphenamine, the first man-made antibiotic. In 1927 Erik Rotheim patented the first aerosol spray can. In 1933 Robert Pauli Scherer created a method to develop softgels.

William Roberts studies about penicillin were continued by Alexander Fleming, who in 1928 concluded that penicillin had an antibiotic effect. In 1944 Howard Florey and Ernst Boris Chain mass-produced penicillin. In 1948 Raymond P. Ahlquist published his seminal work where divided adrenoceptors into α- and β-adrenoceptor subtypes, this allowed a better understanding of drugs mechanisms of action.

In 1987, after Montreal Protocol, CFC inhalers were phased out and HFA inhalers replace them. In 1987 CRISPR technique was discovered by Yoshizumi Ishino that in the next century would be used for genome editing.

21st century CE

21st century begins with the first complete sequences of individual human genomes by Human Genome Project, on 12 February 2001, this allowed a switch in drug development and research from the traditional way of drug discovery that was isolating molecules from plants or animals or create new molecules and see if they could be useful in treatment of illness in humans, to pharmacogenomics, that is the study and knowledge of how genes respond to drugs. Another field beneficed by Human Genome Project is pharmacogenetics, that is the study of inherited genetic differences in drug metabolic pathways which can affect individual responses to drugs, both in terms of therapeutic effect as well as adverse effects.

Humane genome study also allowed to identify which genes are responsible of illness, and to develop drugs for rare diseases and also treatment of illness through gene therapy. In 2015 a simplified form of CRISPR edition was used in humans with Cas9, and also was used an even more simple method, Cas12a that prevent genetic damage from viruses. These advances are improving personalized medicine and allowing precision medicine.

* MA = Monoclonal antibody

SM = Small molecule

ACT = Adoptive cell transfer

See also 
 List of drugs
 Lists of molecules
 History of medicine
 List of pharmaceutical laboratories by year of foundation
 Lists of diseases by year of discovery
 Discovery and development of beta2 agonists
 Pharmacopoeia
 Edwin Smith Papyrus
 De Materia Medica
 Shennong Ben Cao Jing
 The Canon of Medicine
 The Book of Healing

External links
 The Canon of Medicine (text)

References 

History of pharmacy

Lists of drugs